Waititi is a Maori surname from New Zealand. Notable people with the surname include:

Hoani Waititi (1926–1965), New Zealand educator
Kahurangi Waititi (born 1982), New Zealand netball player
Rawiri Waititi (born 1980 or 1981), New Zealand politician
Taika Waititi (born 1975), New Zealand film director
Tweedie Waititi (born ), New Zealand film director and producer

Māori-language surnames